Royal Air Force Kirkistown or more simply RAF Kirkistown is a former Royal Air Force satellite airfield located  of Ballyhalbert, County Down, Northern Ireland.

It was a satellite to the RAF Fighter Command airfield at Ballyhalbert on the Ards Peninsula.

History

RAF Ballyhalbert opened officially on 28 June 1941 and the Kirkistown satellite airfield opened in July 1941. On 22 January 1942, No. 504 Squadron RAF moved to Kirkistown. In 1945, Ballyhalbert Airfield was designated a Royal Naval Air Station as "H.M.S. Corncrake", and Kirkistown Airfield was known as "H.M.S. Corncrake II".
The following units were here at some point:
 No. 485 Squadron RNZAF (1942)
 808 Naval Air Squadron
 818 Naval Air Squadron
 835 Naval Air Squadron
 881 Naval Air Squadron
 885 Naval Air Squadron
 887 Naval Air Squadron
 No. 1493 (Target Towing) Flight RAF (April - May 1942) became No. 1493 (Fighter) Gunnery Flight RAF (May - November 1942)
 No. 2898 Squadron RAF Regiment
 No. 4117 Anti-Aircraft Flight RAF Regiment

Current use

Today the site is home to Kirkistown Circuit, a regular venue for car and motorcycle races. The circuit utilises the northern parts of the former air base's runways and perimeter roadways.

See also
List of former Royal Air Force stations

References

Citations

Bibliography

Kirkistown
Kir
Kir
Buildings and structures in County Down
Military history of County Down
Defunct airports in Northern Ireland